Sa'ad Khair was a Jordanian Intelligence and Security official.

Career
Between 2000 and 2005, Sa'ad Khair was the head of the newly formed Jordanian National Security Agency, otherwise known as General Intelligence Directorate, and was a key U.S. ally in the War on Terror. He participated in the CIA extraordinary rendition of people suspected by the US government of being terrorists.

During the Suisse secrets investigation it became known that he had one Credit Suisse account of more than 28 million Swiss francs, even though he qualified as a politically exposed person. His brother and wife held accounts of 13 and 6 million francs, respectively.

In popular culture
The character ‘Hani Salaam’ in the Sir Ridley Scott film Body of Lies is said to have been largely inspired by the six-year tenure of Sa’ad Khair as the GID chief. David Ignatius, author of the novel on which the film is based, has written about his encounter with Khair and modelling the character after him. Both the story and the film feature incidents directly inspired by Saad Khair’s experiences as the spy chief, as the author says, the part where Hani Salaam meets with a jihadist making him talk with his mother on phone and the fearsome spy headquarters’ being called the ‘fingernail factory’ are among a few. The first incident, in real life, took place in an 'Eastern European city where Khair with his team tracked down an undercover jihadist in an apartment and made him talk with his mother on phone in an attempt to force him emotionally in 'changing side' to the Jordanian government.

‘Hani Salaam’ was portrayed by British actor Mark Strong, whose performance in the film got particular critical acclaim because of its notable suavity and illusiveness, which according to the original author reflected the personality of Sa’ad Khair.

See also
Suisse secrets

References

External links
 Jordan gets new intelligence chief - Al-jazeera.net
Al-Rai Newspaper   المشير سعد خير في ذمة الله
Muneeb Madi and Suleiman Mousa. History of Jordan in the Twentieth Century 1900-1959, Al-Muhtaseb Library, 1988.

2009 deaths
Jordanian military personnel
1956 births